Hitto of Freising (died 835) was the sixth Bishop of Freising from December 811 to 835.

He was descended from the Huosi family, part of the Bavarian upper aristocracy (Hochadel). In 794, the cleric became the deacon of Freising Cathedral and was frequently named as a witness in the Freising documents. He is first recorded as Bishop of Freising in 812, his predecessor, Atto, however, had died over a year earlier. During his time in office, the monk and notary,  Kozroh, compiled the first Freising Book of Traditions (Freisinger Traditionsbuch), which went back to 744. Under Hitto, the Freising scriptorium reached a special high point; for example, about 40 codices were written. In addition, over 300 documents from Hitto's time in office have survived. Hitto clearly strove to establish episcopal supremacy over the many, hitherto aristocratic, independent monasteries within the diocese (such as Schliersee Abbey in 817 Schäftlarn Abbey in 821 or 828, and Innichen Abbey in 822). He was also the founder of Weihenstephan Abbey around 830. According to an old tradition, during his pilgrimage to Rome in 834 Hitto was given the relics of Saint Justin by Pope Gregory IV, and brought them to Freising. Hitto was buried in the cathedral crypt at Freising; his sarcophagus is preserved. His nephew Erchanbert became his successor.

Sources 
Theodor Bitterauf: Die Tradition des Hochstifts Freising. I, 1905, pp. 300–367.
Gertrud Diepolder: Freisinger Traditionen und Memorialeinträge im Salzburger Liber Vitae und im Reichenauer Verbrüderungsbuch. Auswertung der Parallelüberlieferung aus der Zeit der Bischöfe Hitto und Erchanbert von Freising. In: ZBLG. 58 (1995), pp. 147–190

9th-century bishops in Bavaria
Roman Catholic bishops of Freising
8th-century births
835 deaths
Baiuvarii